Alexandre Cazeau de Roumillac (1727–1796) was a French economist.

1727 births
1796 deaths
French economists
People from Angoulême